The 1966 Arlington State Rebels football team was an American football team that represented Arlington State College (now known as the University of Texas at Arlington) in the Southland Conference during the 1966 NCAA College Division football season. In their first year under head coach Burley Bearden, the team compiled a 6–4 record and were Southland Conference co-champions.

Schedule

References

Arlington State
Texas–Arlington Mavericks football seasons
Southland Conference football champion seasons
Arlington State Rebels football